Dana Cortez Howard (born February 27, 1972) is a former American football linebacker in the National Football League (NFL) for the St. Louis Rams and Chicago Bears. He played college football at the University of Illinois.

Early years
Howard was born in East St. Louis, Illinois. He had an inauspicious beginning in football, being cut by his head coach in Junior High.

He attended East St. Louis High School, where he played both linebacker and tight end for the Flyers high school football team coached by Bob Shannon. As a senior, he helped the school win the 6A state title, while receiving Parade All-America and All-state honors. In track he once threw the shot put 60'.

College career
Howard accepted a football scholarship from the University of Illinois, where he became a four-year starter. After being redshirted because the team had starter Darrick Brownlow at middle linebacker, in his freshman season he posted 134 tackles (conference record) and 4 sacks. He made a career-high 24 total tackles and a school record 20 solo tackles against Ohio State University. He had 23 tackles against the University of Michigan.

From the start of his sophomore season he was a member of a talented linebacker corps that included fellow standouts Kevin Hardy, Simeon Rice and John Holecek. He registered 138 tackles and 4 forced fumbles. He had 18 tackles against the University of Michigan and 17 against Ohio State University.

As a junior, he had 123 tackles and 4 passes defensed. He made 17 tackles against the University of Minnesota.

As a senior in 1994, he recorded career-highs in tackles (141), tackles for loss (9), fumble recoveries (4) and interceptions (2), while also making 3 sacks and 2 forced fumbles. He tallied 18 tackles against Purdue University and the University of Michigan. He was recognized as a consensus first-team All-American that season, becoming the first Illini player to win the Dick Butkus Award and Jack Lambert Award, both presented annually to the best linebacker in college football.

He was the first player in school history to register at least 100 tackles in each of his four seasons, to lead the team in tackles for four straight years and he also finished as the all-time leading tackler in school and conference history with 595.

In 2017, he was inducted into the St. Louis Sports Hall of Fame. In 2018, he was inducted into the College Football Hall of Fame. In 2018, he was inducted into the Illinois Athletics Hall of Fame.

Professional career

Dallas Cowboys
Howard was selected by the Dallas Cowboys in the fifth round (168th overall) of the 1995 NFL Draft, after dropping because of size concerns. He was waived on August 27.

St. Louis Rams
On August 28, 1995, he was signed by the St. Louis Rams. He played in 16 games as a rookie. He was released on August 20, 1996.

Chicago Bears
On November 6, 1996, he signed with the Chicago Bears, playing in three games before breaking a finger and being placed on the injured reserve list. He wasn't re-signed at the end of the year.

Philadelphia Eagles
On February 11, 1999, he was signed by the Philadelphia Eagles. He was allocated to the Amsterdam Admirals of NFL Europe in the offseason. He was cut on September 4.

Personal life
He is the owner of Zoie LLC DBA Dana Howard Construction Company based in Belleville, Illinois.

References

External links
Where Are They Now - Dana Howard
A Model For Others To Follow

1972 births
Living people
Sportspeople from East St. Louis, Illinois
Players of American football from Illinois
All-American college football players
Illinois Fighting Illini football players
Chicago Bears players
St. Louis Rams players
Amsterdam Admirals players